Kaniūkai is a village in , Varėna District Municipality, in Alytus County, southeastern Lithuania. According to the 2001 census, the village had a population of 50 people. At the 2011 census, the population was 35.

References

Villages in Varėna District Municipality